Golbey is a commune in the Vosges department in Grand Est in northeastern France. It lies on the left bank of the Moselle, directly north of Épinal.

Population

See also
Communes of the Vosges department

References

Communes of Vosges (department)